The Aberdare Urban District Council was established in 1894 and covered the parish of Aberdare. Its responsibilities included public health, sanitation, roads and public works generally.

There were five wards, namely Aberaman (also known as No. 5 Ward), Blaengwawr (also known as No. 4 Ward), Gadlys (also known as No. 2 Ward), Llwydcoed (also known as No. 1 Ward), and the Town Ward (also known as No. 3 Ward).  Originally, one member was elected from each ward on an annual basis, but from 1904 an additional member was granted to each ward resulting in the election of ten members, out of a total of twenty, every three years. At the intervening election, one member continued to be elected.

An election was held in April 1905. It was preceded by the 1904 election and followed by the 1906 election. The term of office of members elected at the 1902 election came to an end and those elected were to serve until 1908. There were contested elections in three of the five wards. In both the Gadlys and Town wards the sitting members were returned unopposed after the Trades and Labour Council resolved not to run candidates.

(*) denotes sitting member

Results

Aberaman Ward

Blaengwawr Ward
Having come within 71 votes of Howell at the 1904 county election, Treharne's supporters had been hopeful of success.

Gadlys Ward

Llwydcoed Ward

Town Ward

References

Bibliography
 
 

1905
1905 Welsh local elections